Nanobagrus nebulosus is a species of bagrid catfish endemic to Malaysia where it is found in the Endau and Sedili River drainages in the southeastern Malay Peninsula.  It grows to a length of 3.5 cm and has a brown body with three rows of cream-colored spots that are found above, along, and below the lateral line.

References 

Bagridae
Freshwater fish of Malaysia
Fish described in 1999